The Borough of Boothferry was, from 1 April 1974 to 1 April 1996, a local government district with borough status within the non-metropolitan county of Humberside. The district is now split between the East Riding of Yorkshire and North Lincolnshire.

The borough was formed from parts of three administrative counties:  from the West Riding of Yorkshire came the former borough of Goole and Goole Rural District, from the East Riding of Yorkshire came Howden Rural District and from Lincolnshire, Parts of Lindsey came Isle of Axholme Rural District.

The district was named after the village of Boothferry, site of a bridge over the River Ouse, near the centre of the borough.

Parishes
At abolition, the district consisted of the following civil parishes:

References

Former non-metropolitan districts of Humberside
Former boroughs in England